The Matthews-MacFayden House is a historic house at 206 Dooley Road in North Little Rock, Arkansas.  It is a two-story brick structure, with gable-on-hip roof, and a projecting single-story gable-roofed section on the right side of the front.  Decoratively corbelled brick chimneys rise at the center of the main roof, and a projecting wood-framed oriel window adds a distinctive touch to the front.  The house was built in 1930 by developer Justin Matthews as part of his Edgemont development, and was designed by his company architect, Frank Carmean.  It is a picturesque example of English Revival architecture.

The house was listed on the National Register of Historic Places in 1992.

See also
National Register of Historic Places listings in Pulaski County, Arkansas

References

Houses on the National Register of Historic Places in Arkansas
Houses completed in 1930
National Register of Historic Places in Pulaski County, Arkansas
Houses in North Little Rock, Arkansas